The 1933 Copa del Presidente de la República Final was the 33rd final of the principal Spanish football cup competition, now known as the Copa del Rey. Athletic Bilbao beat Madrid FC 2–1 and won their 13th title, the fourth in a row.

Road to the final

Match details

See also
El Viejo Clásico

References
linguasport.com
RSSSF.com

External links
MundoDeportivo.com 
Marca.com 
AS.com 

1933
Copa
Real Madrid CF matches
Athletic Bilbao matches